Nóra Köves (born 13 June 1971) is a former Hungarian tennis player. She won a total of four singles and ten doubles ITF titles during her career and on 24 May 1999 peaked at No. 181 in the singles rankings. On 7 June 1999, Köves achieved a career-high doubles ranking of world No. 138.

Partnering Rebecca Jensen, Köves reached the second round of the 1994 US Open women's doubles tournament.

ITF Circuit finals

Singles: 7 (4–3)

Doubles: 23 (10–13)

References
 
 

1971 births
Living people
Hungarian female tennis players
Kansas Jayhawks women's tennis players